Kentucky Route 1031 (KY 1031) is a  state highway in Muhlenberg County, Kentucky. It runs from U.S. Route 62, U.S. Route 431, and Kentucky Route 70 in southern Central City to U.S. Route 431 south of South Carrollton via Central City.

Route description
From the intersection of U.S. Route 431 (US 431), US 62, and KY 70, KY 1031 follows the original US 431 alignment through downtown Central City. It has intersections with two other state routes, KY 304, and then KY 277. It ends at an intersection with US 431 just south of South Carrollton.

History
The route was originally an alignment of US 431 in downtown Central City, some of which was co-signed with KY 70. However, in 2011, it was rerouted to run concurrently with US 62 west and onto the former KY 189 Bypass (which was also originally the US 431 and KY 70 Truck routes) due to the low-clearance bridge carrying the Paducah and Louisville Railroad over the street in the central business district. After re-routing US 431 onto the bypass, this road received the KY 1031 designation, while KY 70's original alignment on Front Street into downtown became KY 304.

Major intersections

See also

References

External links
US 431 at Kentucky Roads

1031
Transportation in Muhlenberg County, Kentucky
U.S. Route 431
Kentucky Route 70